Cheshmeh-ye Gazu (also Romanized as Cheshmeh-ye Gazū) is a village in Baqeran Rural District, in the Central District of Birjand County, South Khorasan Province, Iran. At the 2006 census, its population was 16, in 6 families.

References 

Populated places in Birjand County